Blessed Sacrament High School is an English medium co-educational higher secondary school situated in the city of Puri in Odisha.  The school was established in the year 1953 by Sisters Adorers and is affiliated to Indian Certificate of Secondary Education.  It runs classes from std. I to X, with "love and service" as the motto.

It is recognized as one of the top schools in the state of Odisha.

Vision 
The vision of the school is to steer the student community in the right direction by instilling in them the life values like integrity, solidarity and tolerance, thereby ensuring peace, progress and happiness.

Facilities 
The school has modern well-equipped science lab, computer lab, multi-media system and a well – stocked library, sports, NCC, scout, guide and house system.

Notable alumni
Baisali Mohanty, ALC Global Fellow at University of Oxford, United Kingdom

See also
Education in India
Puri

References

External links

Primary schools in India
High schools and secondary schools in Odisha
Christian schools in Odisha
Puri
Educational institutions established in 1953
1953 establishments in Orissa